China Foods Limited, shortly China Foods and formerly COFCO International Limited, is a listed company in the Hong Kong Stock Exchange, which is engaged in food processing and food trading, including oilseed, wineries, beverage, confectionery, wheat, brewing materials, rice, biofuel, biochemicals, edible oil and non-rice foodstuff products. On January 4, 2019, the Chairman of the company, Ma Jianping, stepped down. On the same day, Yu Xubo was appointed as chairman of the board. [1]

Since 21 March 2007, it has split and listed China Agri-Industries Holdings Limited in the Hong Kong Stock Exchange.
COFCO Wines & Spirits Co., Ltd. is a subsidiary of COFCO group that specializes in alcoholic drinks business.

See also
 List of food companies

External links
 China Foods Limited
https://finance.yahoo.com/news/brief-china-foods-says-ma-135356443.html

Companies listed on the Hong Kong Stock Exchange
Food and drink companies established in 1993
Food and drink companies based in Beijing
Government-owned companies of China
COFCO Group
Chinese brands
Chinese companies established in 1993

de:COFCO